Sheykh Ali Kalayeh (also Romanized as Sheykh ‘Alī Kalāyeh and Sheykh ‘Alī Kelāyeh) is a village in Rudboneh Rural District, Rudboneh District, Lahijan County, Gilan Province, Iran. At the 2006 census, its population was 410, in 125 families.

References 

Populated places in Lahijan County